Zameen may refer to:

 Zameen.com, a Pakistani property website 
 Zameen (1943 film), a Bollywood film
 Zameen (2003 film), an Indian action thriller film
 Zameen (novel), an Urdu novel by Khadija Mastoor

See also 
 Zameen (film), list of films titled Zameen
 Zamin (disambiguation)